Linum marginale, commonly known as  native flax or wild flax, is a species of flowering plant in the family Linaceae and is endemic to Australia. It is a perennial herb with few branches, linear leaves, and blue flowers with five usually blue petals with darker veins.

Description
Flowering occurs in spring and summer and the fruit is a more or less spherical capsule  in diameter and containing brown seeds.

Taxonomy
Linum marginale was first formally described in 1825 by Allan Cunningham in Barron Field's Geographical Memoirs on New South Wales. The specific epithet (marginale) means "along the edge", referring to the sepals.

Distribution and habitat
Native flax occurs in all Australian states, but not the Northern Territory. It is widespread in grassland, woodland and forest, sometimes on the edge of swamps and is found in most regions of New South Wales and Victoria, but only in the south-west of Western Australia and the south-east of South Australia.

References

marginale
Flora of Australia
Plants described in 1825
Taxa named by Allan Cunningham (botanist)